Protolloydolithus is a genus of trinucleid trilobites found in Ordovician rocks in Gilwern Hill, Powys, Wales.

References

 The World Encyclopedia of Fossils& Fossil-Collecting, Steve Parker
 Protolloydolithus fact file

Trinucleidae
Asaphida genera
Ordovician trilobites of Europe